Alexandre Marius Jacob (September 29, 1879 – August 28, 1954), also known by the names Georges, Escande, Férau, Jean Concorde, Attila, and Barrabas, was a French anarchist illegalist.

Biography 
Jacob was born in 1879 in Marseille to a working-class family; his father, Joseph, was a baker. At the age of eleven, he signed up as a sailor's apprentice; he would later say, "I have seen the world; it is not beautiful". 

Back in Marseilles, on March 31, 1899, he stole from a pawn shop, his first action as an illegalist. He was later arrested in Toulon and faked insanity to avoid five years of prison. On April 19, 1900, he escaped from the Montperrin asylum in Aix-en-Provence with the assistance of a male nurse, Royère, and took refuge in Sète. There he organized a band of men, calling them "the workers of the night." The principles were simple: one does not kill, except to protect his life and his freedom from the police. A percentage of the stolen money was to be invested into the anarchist cause. 

Roughly 150 burglaries have been attributed to him. He made headlines not just for the clever burglaries themselves, but for the mocking notes the gang would leave behind. One such note, left at the church of Saint Sever in Rouen on February 14, 1901, read "" ("God of thieves, look for the thieves of those who have stolen from others"). 

The gang had several clashes with police. In Orléans, on February 27, 1901, Jacob shot a police officer in order to escape. His friend and accomplice Royère was arrested. Various gang members were arrested in the period 1901-1903. Finally, on April 21, 1903, an operation carried out in Abbeville turned sour. Having killed a police officer in order to escape, Jacob and his two accomplices were captured. Two years later in Amiens Jacob appeared in court, with 23 co-accused. He turned out to be a fierce rhetorician, and the trial gave him a platform for his ideas, among them, "." ("The right to life cannot be begged for, it must be taken.") He spoke of robbing priests and finding that each one had a safe, sometimes several, containing money that had been given by parishioners to the church but kept by the priests themselves. 

The court sentenced him to forced labour for life on March 22, 1905. He was sent to the Salvation Islands. He was frequently brought before the prison courts for escape attempts, and also in 1908 for murder (of a fellow convict, Capelletti), and spent three years in prison on Île Saint-Joseph. Throughout his imprisonment, he maintained correspondence with his mother Marie, who campaigned for her son's release. On July 14, 1925, his sentence was commuted to five years' imprisonment, to be served in France. He was released on December 31, 1927. 

At first, he worked in Paris, but in 1931, he became am itinerant pedlar. In 1936, he went to Barcelona in the hopes of aiding the syndicalist CNT, but soon returned to France. His mother died in 1941. He desired "to die in good health" rather than of old age. "" ("I have lived, I can die"), he wrote in a letter of August 17, 1954; he died on August 28. 

While he never renounced his anarchist and anti-fascist convictions, he did express doubt regarding the merits of illegalism at the end of his life.

References

Bibliography 
 Écrits by Alexandre Marius Jacob
 Marius Jacob, the Anarchist Cambrioleur by William Caruchet, Séguier editions
 An Anarchist of the Beautiful Time, Alexandre Jacob by Alain Sergent
 Lives of Alexandre Jacob 1879-1954 by Bernard Thomas, Fayard 1970, Mazarine 1998.
Alexandre Jacob l'honnête cambrioleur by Jean-Marc Delpech, Atelier de création libertaire, 2008

External links 

 A comic strip about Marius Jacob 
 À la mémoire de l’anarchiste: Marius Jacob 
 Amiens trial Daily Bleed Calendar, March 22, 1905
 Alexandre Jacob l'honnête cambrioleur 

1879 births
1954 deaths
Criminals from Marseille
Individualist anarchists
Illegalists
French anarchists
19th-century French criminals
Anarchism in French Guiana
20th-century French criminals
1954 suicides
Politicians from Marseille